Cottus may refer to:
Cottus, one of the Hecatoncheires of Greek mythology
Cottus (fish), a genus of sculpin fish